Cao Lỗ (高魯, also known as Đô Lỗ, Thạch Thần, or Đại Than Đô Lỗ Thạch Thần) was a Vietnamese weaponry engineer and minister who helped King An Dương Vương build a crossbow, which he christened "Saintly Crossbow of the Supernaturally Golden Claw."

See also
 Triệu dynasty
 Nam Việt
 Triệu Đà
 Trọng Thuỷ
 An Dương Vương
 Âu Lạc
 Đông Sơn culture
 Bách Việt

References

Sources
https://books.google.com/books?id=rCl_02LnNVIC&pg=PA316&lpg=PA316&dq=cao+lo+birth+of+vietnam&source=bl&ots=J1akBMhJPd&sig=CDo6h_PK4CenY1Glh-7rJ6eY9JE&hl=en&ei=dC61SeWUD4mMsAOZtsh8&sa=X&oi=book_result&resnum=1&ct=result

Vietnamese engineers
People from Bắc Ninh province
Ancient Vietnam
Deified Vietnamese people
Vietnamese deities
Vietnamese gods